Oscar Allen may refer to:
Oscar Allen (footballer) (born 1999), Australian rules footballer for the West Coast Eagles
Oscar K. Allen (1882–1936), 42nd governor of Louisiana
Oscar Dana Allen (1836–1913), American professor of chemistry